Andrei Vladimirovich Prudnikov (born 9 September 1984) is a former Russian professional football player.

Club career
He played in the Belarusian Premier League for FC Naftan Novopolotsk in 2013.

External links
 Career summary by sportbox.ru
 
 

1984 births
Living people
Russian footballers
Association football forwards
FC Polotsk players
FC Naftan Novopolotsk players
Belarusian Premier League players
Russian expatriate footballers
Expatriate footballers in Belarus
Sportspeople from Smolensk Oblast